Tosbulak (Тасбулак), until 2005 known as Tusplok (Тусплок), is a small village in the Shalkar District of the Aktobe Region of Kazakhstan. Tusplok is in the south of the region. Tusplok's closest villages are Shendy, and Zhilan.

References 

Populated places in Aktobe Region